ECoC or eCoC may refer to :
 European Capital of Culture.
 electronic certificate of conformity.
 European Conference on Optical Communication.
 Encyclopaedia of Chess Openings.